Cosmoledo Atoll is an atoll of the Aldabra Group and belongs to the Outer Islands of the Seychelles, and is located  southwest of the capital, Victoria, on Mahé Island.

History
The name Cosmoledo is said to honor a Portuguese navigator who was part of Juan de Nova's crew.

Menai and Wizard Islands were named after ships that explored the atoll on the Moresby Expedition in 1822.

In 1878, Sergeant Rivers visited the atoll and reported that judging by the turtle remains on the beach, the atoll was frequently visited by fishermen and whalers. He found a recently destroyed hut and ‘turtle park’ on Menai; a hut on the southern point of Wizard built from the wreckage of the Merry Monarch (wrecked in April 1874), which had been burnt. He reported that Menai was virtually covered with tall mangroves. Cosmoledo was settled shortly after this and a visitor in 1895, noted 200-300 coconut trees, maize and goats. By 1901 there were just two men on Menai, one on Wizard and four on North-east Island. Exploitation of guano on North-east Island was taking place in 1901, when 120 tons had been removed. A few years later, mangrove bark had become an important product; it was dried and exported for tannin. The atoll was inhabited as a fishing and turtling station until 1992 when it was abandoned.

Geography
Cosmoledo Atoll is a raised coral atoll that is 17 km long east–west, and 12.5 km north–south. The islands land area is 5.2 km2, and the lagoon and the reef flats have an area of 145 km2. The closest island is Astove Island, 35 km farther south. The lagoon is up to 8.2 metres deep. Geologically, it is the twin of Astove Island, standing on the same volcanic basement measuring 85 km from north to south and 52 km from east to west and rising from a depth of over 4 km. The two islands are sometimes known together as the Cosmoledo Group. The two peaks join at a depth of around 1 km. Unlike the steep wall of Astove, the sea floor falls gradually to about 50 metres over a distance of up to a kilometer then more steeply reaching 500 metres in about 1.5 km. Two main passes lead from the ocean to the shallow lagoon, one northwest of South Island and one (Grande Passe) between Pagoda Island and Wizard Island. On the western coast, elevated reef rock forms undercut headlands mirroring the waves of the sea and separated by sandy beaches. There are sand dunes in the north and south, rising to about 10 meters.

List of islands
The Constitution of Seychelles names 20 islands although there are also a number of unnamed islets in the atoll.

The South-East passage is between Pagoda Island and Wizard Island.
Menai Island west coast is sandy. Johannes Point, the NW extremity of the island, is conspicuous. The village is located at this point.

Demographics
Menai village has a large cemetery. the village was abandoned in 1992.

Administration
The island belongs to Outer Islands District.

Flora and fauna
Cosmoledo is an Important Bird Area and holds Seychelles' largest colonies of all three species of booby that breed in Seychelles. The atoll holds the last viable population of brown booby, breeding mainly on South Island, with a few on West-North Island.  It also has the Indian Ocean's largest population of red-footed booby censused by the Island Conservation Society as about 15,000 pairs.  Exploitation has wiped out the lesser frigatebird and has almost done the same to the great frigatebird, which is down to just 15 pairs compared to hundreds of pairs in the 1970s.  Despite this, hundreds of non-breeding frigatebirds of both species are to be seen, these being probably from Aldabra. The lesser frigatebird also once bred but now may be extinct.  Cosmoledo also has Seychelles' largest colony of sooty tern breeding on the northern end of Wizard Island. Second only to Aldabra are the numbers of breeding red-tailed tropicbird, black-naped tern and crested tern.

The lagoon is an important feeding ground for migratory waders, with crab plover and ruddy turnstone most common.  There are three endemic races of land bird: the Madagascar white-eye (race menaiensis), the souimanga sunbird (race buchenorum) and a particular form of Madagascar turtle dove.  The Madagascar cisticola is also common and there are a few pied crow present.

The flora is similar to that of Aldabra, with fewer species but including several plants endemic to the group. As on Aldabra there are areas of tall mangrove, especially on the lagoon side of Menai Island. Coconuts are common only on Menai, where many were planted.

Lizards include Bouton's snake-eyed skink and Madagascar banded lizard, the latter found nowhere else in Seychelles. Green turtle nest in reasonably large numbers, despite decades of exploitation in the past and poaching in the present. The reefs are spectacular and offer some of the best diving in Seychelles.

The Island Conservation Society has carried out conservation and rehabilitation work on the atoll, including the eradication of introduced rats and cats on several islands.

Tourism
There are fly-fishing cruises to the atoll on a regular basis.
The IDC have proposed a plan for an eco-resort with about 20 rooms to be built at Menai in 2019.

Image gallery

References

External links 

 National Bureau of Statistics
 Atoll research Bulletin
 Atoll Research Bulletin vol. 83 "Notes on some of the Seychelles Islands, Indian Ocean"
 Atoll Research Bulletin vol. 136 "Coral islands of the Western Indian Ocean" (map of Cosmoledo, p. 139)
 Satellite Images
 Island Conservation Society 
 Fishing at Cosmoledo

Outer Islands (Seychelles)
Atolls of Seychelles
Uninhabited islands of Seychelles
Important Bird Areas of Seychelles